The Gorges du Tarn is a canyon formed by the Tarn (river) between the Causse Méjean and the Causse de Sauveterre, in southern France.

Geography and geology

The architecture of the gorges involves Mesozoic limestone plateaux downstream presenting sub-vertical cliffs.  Faults like the Hauterive Fault explain the important water sources in the region of Sainte-Enimie (the Burle source and the Coussac source, the latter joining the Tarn in an impressive waterfall), and the more complex geology in the upstream part of the canyon.

In the Quaternary, the gorges were also affected by volcanic activity whose traces can be found in the Causse de Sauveterre, in the form of a double or anticlinal volcanic dip, and in the basaltic rocks next to Eglazines.

The climate is Mediterranean, with relatively mild winters and very warm summers.

Tourism

Tourism is a main factor of development in the region, with activities that include:
 Hiking
 Kayaking
 Caving in the Causses
 Visiting typical villages such as Cirque de Saint-Chély-du-Tarn
 Rock climbing
 Outdoor sports and leisure activities

Architecture
Many castles have been built along the Gorges, most of them dating back to the Middle Ages, such as those of Castelbouc, Lacaze, Hauterives, La Malène or Saint-Rome-de-Dolan.

See also
 Tourism in Tarn

References

External links

 Office de Tourisme des Cévennes - Gorges du Tarn
 Gorges du Tarn on About-France.com

Landforms of Aveyron
Landforms of Lozère
Tarn
Tourist attractions in Lozère
Tourist attractions in Aveyron